This is a list of unresolved mudder cases of Bangladesh.

1970s
On 20 December 1971, Kader Siddique was involved in torturing, humiliating, and beyneting four prisoners of war to death.

On 2 January 1975, Siraj Sikder was killed in the custody of police on their way to Rakkhi Bahini Camp in Savar, Dhaka.

1980s
On 1 June 1981, Major General Muhammad Abul Manzoor was killed in Chittagong. Former president of Bangladesh Hussain Muhammad Ershad is the main accused of the murder case.

1990s
On 6 September 1996, a prominent Bangladeshi film actor Salman Shah was found dead in his apartment. The case is recently revived by the Dhaka Court. His wife Samira Haque and businessman Aziz Mohammad Bhai is allegedly involved in the murder.

On 18 December 1998, a prominent Bangladeshi film actor Sohel Chowdhury was shot dead in front of a club in Banani, Dhaka. No trial was made even after 17 years.

2000s
On 27 January 2005, Minister of Finance Shah AMS Kibria and his nephew Shah Manzur Huda was killed in a granade attack which is yet to be solved after twelve years.

On 28 October 2006, four activists of  Jamaaat-e-Islami were beaten to death by Awami League activists. That incident is famously known as "logi boitha killing".

2010s
On 11 February 2012, prominent TV journalist couple Sagar Sarowar and Meherun Runi were murdered in their apartment which is still unresolved.

On 8 March 2013, an A-level student named Tanvir Muhammad Taqi was found murdered and floating in Shitalakshya River of Narayanganj. It is widely believed that the Awami League MP of Narayanganj Shamim Osman was instrumental behind this murder. No case has been taken by police, no investigation done, and nobody was charged.

On 20 May 2014, Ekramul Haque, Chairman of Fulgazi Upazila was shot and burnt alive. Joynal Hazari, an MP of Awami League from Feni District of Bangladesh is believed to be involved in the murder.

On 25 August 2014, cleric and TV host Nurul Islam Farooqi was killed by unknown assailants in his office.

On 23 April 2016, A. F. M. Rezaul Karim Siddique, a professor of department of English in Rahshahi University was murdered.

On 29  March 2017, Raudha Athif , a Maldivian MBBS 2nd year medical student in Rahshahi was murdered and thrown across the bed in her hostel room in the Islami Bank Medical College at  Rajshahi. Raudha Athif (18 May 1996 – 29 March 2017) was a Vogue model and medical student who was killed in Rajshahi, Bangladesh and her parents claim that she was brutally strangled with a belt and before that she was manually strangulated by hand (throttling).

See also 

List of journalists killed in Bangladesh

Attacks by Islamic extremists in Bangladesh

References 

Murder in Bangladesh